Utetheisa devriesi is a moth in the family Erebidae. It was described by Alan H. Hayes in 1975. It is endemic to the Galápagos Islands.

References

Moths described in 1975
devriesi